Trichromia coccineata is a moth in the subfamily Arctiinae. It was described by Rothschild in 1935. It is found in French Guiana, Suriname and Amazonas.

Subspecies
Trichromia coccineata coccineata
Trichromia coccineata parvimacula (Rothschild, 1922) (French Guiana)

References

Moths described in 1935
coccineata